Carcannon is an automotive inspection and consulting company headquartered in Chevy Chase, Maryland with an office in El Segundo, California. Carcannon is credited with producing the first national “Certified Consultation Process” for original equipment manufacturers (OEMs).  The company was founded in 2001 by Ron Correa.

Customers
Carcannon sells its services to Mercedes-Benz, Porsche, Audi, Nissan, Infiniti, Volkswagen, Subaru, and the Council of Better Business Bureaus.

Media coverage

2006
In 2006, Automotive News reported that General Motors launched an initiative to standardize the way dealerships physically present GM certified used vehicles on the dealership lots. GM hired Carcannon to create the initiative and provide the consultants to implement it.

2009
In 2009, US Fed News reported that the United States Patent and Trademark Office issued the trademark “New Vehicle Pre-Delivery Service Inspections” (Reg. No. 3726917, Trademark application serial number 77784580) to Carcannon.

2011
In 2011, it was reported that Carcannon teamed up with Audi to provide certified pre-owned inspections for all of Audi's cars.

2012
In 2012, Auto Remarketing wrote that Volkswagen of America selected Carcannon to give certified pre-owned consultations to all of Volkswagen's dealerships in the United States.

External links
 Carcannon website

See also
 Certified Pre-Owned
 Extended warranty

References

Automotive companies of the United States